Drumheller Fountain, also known as the Frosh Pond since the early 1900s, is an outdoor fountain on the University of Washington campus in Seattle, Washington, in the United States. The fountain was given its name is 1961 to honor the University Regent Joseph Drumheller, who gifted the actual fountain to the University for its centennial celebration.  

Drumheller Fountain is predated by a pond similar in design and location known as Geyser Basin, which was built for the 1909 Alaska-Yukon-Pacific Exposition. While the design and location are similar, Geyser Basin was a separate, distinct structure from the current-day Drumheller Fountain.

See also
 Campus of the University of Washington

References

External links

 Drumheller Fountain - University of Washington - Seattle, WA at Waymarking

1900s in Seattle
Fountains in Washington (state)
University of Washington campus